This is a list of firearm cartridges which have bullets of a caliber between  and .

Length refers to the cartridge case length
OAL refers to the overall length of the cartridge

Measurements are in millimeters then inches, i.e. mm (in).

Pistol cartridges

Rifle cartridges

.24 in (6.2 mm)

.25 in (6.5 mm)

.264 in (6.6 mm) and up

See also
.25 caliber

References

Pistol and rifle cartridges